The Brabham BT23 was a formula racing car built by Brabham in 1967.

Development
The BT23 was designed as a Formula 2 racing car and most of the vehicles of this type were also used in this racing series. There was also a Tasman version and some BT23s were converted for Formula One by private drivers.

Design
The suspension consisted of double wishbones, coaxial coil springs, and a stabilizer bar in the front section and inverted lower wishbones, trailing arms, coil springs, and stabilizer bars in the rear section. The braking system consisted of four disc brakes.

The car had a space frame, which was reinforced by load-bearing plates in the Tasman version. Jochen Rindt dominated the 1967 and 1968 Formula 2 seasons with the BT23 at will. He won nine laps out of 15, but failed to score points for the European Drivers' Championship as an A driver.

Racing history
Top drivers including Derek Bell, Kurt Ahrens, Piers Courage, Peter Gethin, and Robin Widdows piloted the BT23. In 1969, motorcycle racer Bill Ivy started his Formula 2 career in a BT23. Jochen Rindt found considerable success in it, winning 9 out of the 15 races in 1967.

Formula One World Championship results

* The entries in the 1967 and 1969 German Grands Prix were in the Formula 2 class and were therefore ineligible for World Championship points or classification.

Formula One Non-Championship results

References

Open wheel racing cars
Brabham racing cars
Formula Two cars